Mondragon or Mondragón may refer to:

Places
 Mondragon, Vaucluse, a town and commune in France
 Mondragon, Northern Samar, a municipality in the Philippines
 Mondragón, a town and municipality in the Basque region of Spain, famous for its cooperative movement
 Mondragon University, a private university in the Basque region of Spain
 Villa Mondragone, a villa near Rome
Antinous Mondragone, a bust of Antinous found in the Roman villa

People
 Cristóbal de Mondragón (1504–1596), Spanish soldier
 Faryd Mondragón (born 1971), Colombian football goalkeeper
 Jorge Mondragón (born 1962), Mexican diver
 Jorge Mondragón (actor) (1903-1997), Mexican actor
 Manuel Mondragón (1859-1922), Mexican general and firearm designer
 Martín Mondragón (born 1953), Mexican long-distance runner
 Michael Mondragon (born 1970), American professional wrestler

Other
 Mondragón CF, a Spanish football club from the city of same name
 Mondragón Cooperative Corporation (Spanish: Mondragón Corporación Cooperativa - MCC), a group of manufacturing and retail companies based in the Basque Country
 Mondragon Bookstore, a worker cooperative political bookshop and coffeehouse in Winnipeg, Manitoba
 Mondragón rifle, a Mexican semi-automatic rifle

Spanish-language surnames
French-language surnames